Kyi Phyu Shin is a Burmese film director, At the 2008 National Geographic Society's All Roads Film Festival, she won the Best Short Award for her documentary A Sketch of Wathone. She attended at BEHS 2 Latha and Yangon Film School. She currently sits on the Bogyoke Film Executive Board, which was formed to develop a biopic about Aung San, the country's founding father.

References

Burmese film directors
People from Yangon
1975 births
Living people